The 2003–04 Israeli Women's Cup (Gvia HaMedina Nashim) was the 6th season of Israel's women's nationwide football cup competition.

The competition was won by Maccabi Holon who had beaten ASA Tel Aviv University 2–0 in the final.

Results

Quarter-finals

Semi-finals
The semi-finals were played on 20 April 2004. Both matches were played in Ness Ziona Stadium.

Final

References
Women's State Cup 2003/4 Women's Football in Israel 

Israel Women's Cup seasons
Cup
Israel